1986 is an American news magazine television series that aired on NBC from June 10 to December 30, 1986.  The lead anchors were Roger Mudd and Connie Chung.  Maria Shriver also contributed to the program.

The show was NBC's 14th attempt in 17 years to launch a prime time news program in a similar fashion that both CBS (60 Minutes) and ABC (20/20) had successfully done.  Roger Mudd was particularly agitated over the quick cancellation of the program and left the network shortly thereafter. It was not until 1992 that NBC finally found a successful program in that mold with Dateline NBC, which is still running as of 2022.

References

External links 
 

1986 American television series debuts
1986 American television series endings
1980s American television news shows
English-language television shows
NBC original programming
NBC News
Television news program articles using incorrect naming style